is a passenger railway station located in the city of Yoshinogawa, Tokushima Prefecture, Japan. It is operated by JR Shikoku and has the station number "B15".

Lines
Only local trains stop at the station.

Layout
The station consists of an island platform serving two tracks. A passing loop runs between the station building and track 1. The station building is unstaffed and serves only as a waiting room. Access to the island platform is by means of a footbridge.

Platforms

Adjacent stations

History
An earlier station at a different location but named "Kawada" (with the same Kanji name 川田駅) had been established by the private Tokushima Railway on 28 August 1907. In the process, Kawada and Funato were closed and Kawata was opened as a new station 1.3 km further to the west than Kawada. With the privatization of Japanese National Railways (JNR), the successor to JGR, on 1 April 1987, the station came under the control of JR Shikoku. On 1 June 1988, the line was renamed the Tokushima Line.

Surrounding area
The area around the station is the center of former Kawada Town
Kawada Post Office
Yoshinogawa City Kawadanishi Elementary School

See also
 List of Railway Stations in Japan

References

External links

 JR Shikoku timetable

Railway stations in Tokushima Prefecture
Railway stations in Japan opened in 1914
Yoshinogawa, Tokushima